The lambert (symbol L, la or Lb) is a non-SI metric unit of luminance named for Johann Heinrich Lambert (1728–1777), a Swiss mathematician, physicist and astronomer. A related unit of luminance, the foot-lambert, is used in the lighting, cinema and flight simulation industries. The SI unit is the candela per square metre (cd/m2).

Definition 
1 lambert (L) =  candela per square centimetre (0.3183 cd/cm2) or  cd m−2

See also
Other units of luminance:

 Apostilb (asb)
 Blondel (blondel)
 Bril (bril)
 Nit (nit)
 Stilb (sb)
 Skot (sk)

References
 "Lighting Design Glossary: Luminance" at Schorsch Lighting Design Knowledgebase

Units of luminance
Non-SI metric units